Chen Feng-yin (born 19 December 1979) is a Taiwanese softball player. She competed in the women's tournament at the 2004 Summer Olympics.

References

External links
 

1979 births
Living people
Taiwanese softball players
Olympic softball players of Taiwan
Softball players at the 2004 Summer Olympics
Place of birth missing (living people)
Asian Games medalists in softball
Softball players at the 2002 Asian Games
Medalists at the 2002 Asian Games
Asian Games silver medalists for Chinese Taipei
21st-century Taiwanese women